The 1974 British Hard Court Championships, also known by its sponsored name Rothmans British Hard Court Championships, was a combined men's and women's tennis tournament played on outdoor clay courts at The West Hants Club in Bournemouth, England. The men's event was part of the Grand Prix circuit and categorized as B class. The tournament was held from 20 May through 26 May 1974. Ilie Năstase and Virginia Wade won the singles titles.

Finals

Men's singles
 Ilie Năstase defeated  Paolo Bertolucci 6–1, 6–3, 6–2

Women's singles
 Virginia Wade defeated  Julie Heldman 6–1, 3–6, 6–1

Men's doubles
 Juan Gisbert /  Ilie Năstase defeated  Corrado Barazzutti /  Paolo Bertolucci  6–4, 6–2, 6–0

Women's doubles
 Julie Heldman /  Virginia Wade defeated  Patti Hogan /  Sharon Walsh 6–2, 6–2

References

External links
 ITF tournament edition details

British Hard Court Championships
British Hard Court Championships
Clay court tennis tournaments
British Hard Court Championships
British Hard Court Championships